Lynne Tillman (born January 1, 1947) is a novelist, short story writer, and cultural critic. She is currently Professor/Writer-in-Residence in the Department of English at the University at Albany and teaches at the School of Visual Arts' Art Criticism and Writing MFA Program.  Tillman is the author of six novels, five collections of short stories, two collection of essays, and two other nonfiction books. She writes a bi-monthly column "In These Intemperate Times" for Frieze Art Magazine.

Career

Fiction 
Tillman's novels include: American Genius, A Comedy (2006); No Lease on Life (1998), which was a finalist for a National Book Critics Award in Fiction; Cast in Doubt (1992); Motion Sickness (1991); and Haunted Houses (1987). In March 2018, her sixth novel Men and Apparitions was published by Soft Skull Press.

Absence Makes the Heart (1990) is Tillman's first collection of short stories. The Broad Picture (1997) is a collection of Tillman's essays, which were published originally in literary and art periodicals.

Her other story collections are: The Madame Realism Complex (1992); This Is Not It (2002), stories written in response to the work of 22 contemporary artists; Someday This Will Be Funny (2011); and The Complete Madame Realism and Other Stories.

Nonfiction 
In 1995, Tillman's nonfiction work, The Velvet Years: Warhol's Factory 1965-1967, was published with photographs by Stephen Shore; it presented 18 Warhol Factory personalities' narratives, based on interviews with them, as well as her critical essay on Andy Warhol, his art and studio. Tillman is also the author of the nonfiction book The Life and Times of Jeannette Watson and Books & Co. (1999), a cultural and social history of a literary landmark where writers and artists congregated for nearly 20 years.

What Would Lynne Tillman Do? (2014), her second essay collection, was a Finalist for the National Book Critics Circle Award in Criticism in 2014.

The entirety of What Would Lynne Tillman Do? is available online.

Personal life
In the 1970s, Tillman squatted in London with Heathcote Williams. As of 2019, she was living in Manhattan with the musician David Hofstra. Her personal papers were purchased by the Fales Library at New York University.

Tillman is a collector of the work of artist Caroline Goe.

Awards and honors
2006 Guggenheim Fellowship
2014 National Book Critics Circle Award (Criticism) finalist for What Would Lynne Tillman Do?
2022 Fiction and Nonfiction Porter Award

Bibliography

Novels 
 
 Motion Sickness (1991)
 Cast in Doubt (1992)
 No Lease on Life (1998)
 American Genius, A Comedy (2006)
 Men and Apparitions (2018)

Short story collections 
 Absence Makes the Heart (1990)
 The Madame Realism Complex (1992)
 This Is Not It (2002)
 Someday This Will Be Funny (2011)
 The Complete Madame Realism and Other Stories (2016)

 Nonfiction 
 The Velvet Years: Warhol's Factory 1965-1967 (1995)
 The Broad Picture" (1997)
 Bookstore: The Life and Times of Jeannette Watson and Books & Co. (1999)
 What Would Lynne Tillman Do? (2014)

Interviews 
 
The Intersection of Writing and Sculpture: Writer Lynne Tillman on Roni Horn 
Lynne Tillman: Men and Apparitions 
In Conversation: Lynne Tillman and Eileen Myles 
Emily LaBarge talks to Lynne Tillman about her new novel, Men and Apparitions.
Finding the Question That Hasn’t Been Asked: An Interview with Lynne Tillman 
An Interview with Lynne Tillman 
An Interview with Lynne Tillman The novelist and critic discusses her new book of fiction—Men and Apparitions.

References

External links

Interview with 3:AM
Lynne Tillman's Innovative Stories by Forrest Gander at The New York Times Book Review
mp3 of Lynne Tillman reading her text 'Hung Up' (4:20) published at Tellus Audio Cassette Magazine
Lee, Sue-Im, 1969-. "Recognition as a Depleted Source in Lynne Tillman's Motion Sickness." symploke 12.1 (2004): 139-151.
2011 radio interview at The Bat Segundo Show
Rasmussen, Eric Dean. "Tillman's Turbulent Thinking." American Book Review 31.6 (2010): 13-15. 
Rasmussen, Eric Dean. "Tillman's Turbulent Thinking." Electronic Book Review 05 Dec. (2010). 
 Tillman, Lynne, Lydia Davis, Eric Dean Rasmussen, and Rone Shavers. “Lydia Davis Interviews Lynne Tillman.” Electronic Book Review 26 March (2011). 
 Fence (magazine)
Lynne Tillman Papers at Fales Library and Special Collections at New York University

20th-century American novelists
American women novelists
Living people
1947 births
20th-century squatters
20th-century American women writers
21st-century American women